Diplazon laetatorius is a hover fly parasitoid wasp in the Diplazontinae subfamily of the Ichneumonid wasp family (Ichneumonidae) It was first described as Ichneumon laetatorius in 1781 by Johan Christian Fabricius.

References

External links
Diplazon laetatorius Images & occurrence data from GBIF

Taxa named by Johan Christian Fabricius
Animals described in 1781
Ichneumonidae